Gabriella Fagundez (born 11 October 1985) is a Swedish swimmer.  She currently holds the 800 m (long course and short course) and 1500 m freestyle (long course) national records, and was part of the teams that holds the Swedish 4 × 100 m record (long course) and 4 × 200 m freestyle (short course).

Personal bests

Long course (50 m)

Short course (25 m)

References

External links
International Championships – Medal and Finals

1985 births
Living people
People from Landskrona Municipality
Swedish female butterfly swimmers
Swedish female freestyle swimmers
Olympic swimmers of Sweden
Swimmers at the 2008 Summer Olympics
Swimmers at the 2012 Summer Olympics
European Aquatics Championships medalists in swimming
SK Ran swimmers
Sportspeople from Skåne County
20th-century Swedish women
21st-century Swedish women